Hebron is a village in McHenry County, Illinois, United States. It is a commuter village within the Chicago metropolitan area. Per the 2020 census, the population was 1,368. It is also the headquarters of Vaughan Manufacturing, one of the largest manufacturers of striking tools in the world.

Geography

Major streets
  Main Street
  Maple Avenue
 Price Road
 Bigelow Avenue

Demographics

2020 census

2000 Census
As of the census of 2000, there were 1,038 people, 390 households, and 271 families residing in the village. The racial makeup of the village was 97.78% White, 0.39% African American, 0.10% Asian, 1.16% from other races, and 0.58% from two or more races. Hispanic or Latino of any race were 5.30% of the population.

There were 390 households, out of which 38.5% had children under the age of 18 living with them, 50.0% were married couples living together, 13.6% had a female householder with no husband present, and 30.5% were non-families. 24.9% of all households were made up of individuals, and 8.7% had someone living alone who was 65 years of age or older. The average household size was 2.66 and the average family size was 3.20.

In the village, the population was spread out, with 31.0% under the age of 18, 7.9% from 18 to 24, 32.4% from 25 to 44, 19.5% from 45 to 64, and 9.2% who were 65 years of age or older. The median age was 33 years. For every 100 females, there were 100.4 males. For every 100 females age 18 and over, there were 91.4 males.

The median income for a household in the village was $46,607, and the median income for a family was $53,661. Males had a median income of $41,036 versus $25,272 for females. The per capita income for the village was $18,829. About 3.3% of families and 5.1% of the population were below the poverty line, including 6.1% of those under age 18 and 3.0% of those age 65 or over.

Fire Protection and EMS
The village and surrounding area are protected by the Hebron Alden Greenwood Fire Protection District. The district comprises 20 members that protect . The district operates out of one fire station located in Hebron. The district operates two engines, two ambulances, two brush trucks, and two tenders. They average 450 emergency calls a year. The district is part of the MercyHealth EMS System and provides ALS (Advanced Life Support) service to the district.

The district holds their annual pig roast on the second Saturday in September each year at the fire station at 12302 Rte 173 in Hebron.

Education 
Alden-Hebron High School is the smallest school to win the Illinois High School Boys Basketball Championship. In 1952, with an enrollment of 98 students, the boys team won the state title with an overtime victory over Quincy with a final score of 64-59. At the time, all Illinois schools competed for a single championship, regardless of enrollment. The town's water tower is painted to look like a basketball in commemoration of the event.

Notable people 

 Elmer Bigelow, recipient of the Medal of Honor; died saving his ship in World War II; born and raised in Hebron.
 George Dunne, longtime President of the Cook County Board of Commissioners. After his political career, he owned and resided on a farm in Hebron.
 Howie Judson, pitcher for the Chicago White Sox and Cincinnati Redlegs (1948–1954); born in Hebron

References

External links
Elmer Bigelow's Medal of Honor citation

Villages in McHenry County, Illinois
Villages in Illinois
Chicago metropolitan area